Ilex palawanica is a species of plant in the family Aquifoliaceae. It is endemic to the Philippines.

References

Endemic flora of the Philippines
palawanica
Vulnerable plants
Flora of Palawan
Taxonomy articles created by Polbot